Bojhena Se Bojhena may refer to:

 Bojhena Se Bojhena (TV series)
 Bojhena Se Bojhena (film)

See also
 Bojhena Shey Bojhena, a 2012 Bengali Tollywood film